The United States Senate Subcommittee on Juvenile Delinquency was established by the United States Senate in 1953 to investigate the problem of juvenile delinquency.

Background 
The subcommittee was a unit of the United States Senate Judiciary Committee and was created by a motion of Senator Robert Hendrickson, a Republican from New Jersey. Its initial budget was $44,000. The first members of the subcommittee consisted of Senator Hendrickson, and Senators Estes Kefauver (Democrat from Tennessee), Thomas C. Hennings, Jr. (Democrat from Missouri), and William Langer (Republican from North Dakota). Senator Hendrickson was initially the chair of the committee but was later replaced as chair by Senator Kefauver.

1954 comic book hearings 
The public hearings took place on April 21, 22, and June 4, 1954, in New York. They focused on particularly graphic "crime and horror" comic books of the day, and their potential impact on juvenile delinquency. When publisher William Gaines contended that he sold only comic books of good taste, Kefauver entered into evidence one of Gaines' comics (Crime SuspenStories #22 [April-May 1954]), which showed a dismembered woman's head on its cover. The exchange between Gaines and Kefauver led to a front-page story in The New York Times the following day.

What none of the senators knew was that Gaines had already cleaned up the cover of this issue. Artist Johnny Craig's first draft included those very elements which Gaines had said were in "bad taste" and had him clean it up before publication.

Because of the unfavorable press coverage resulting from the hearings, the comic book industry adopted the Comics Code Authority, a self-regulatory ratings code that was initially adopted by nearly all comic publishers and continued to be used by some comics until 2011. In the immediate aftermath of the hearings, several publishers were forced to revamp their schedules and drastically censor or even cancel many popular long-standing comic series.

See also 
 Seduction of the Innocent by Fredric Wertham

Notes

References

Bibliography
 Beaty, Bart (2005). Fredric Wertham and the Critique of Mass Culture. University Press of Mississippi, .
 Nyberg, Ami Kiste (1998). Seal of Approval: The History of the Comics Code, University Press of Mississippi, .
 Juvenile Delinquency (Comic Books) hearings before the United States Senate Committee on the Judiciary, Subcommittee To Investigate Juvenile Delinquency in the U.S., Eighty-Third Congress, second session, on Apr. 21, 22, June 4, 1954.

External links 

 1954 Senate Subcommittee Transcripts
 Comic Books and Juvenile Delinquency Interim Report of the Committee on the judiciary pursuant to S. Res. 89 and S. Res. 190
 1955 hearings transcripts: U.S. Congress, Senate, Subcommittee on Juvenile Delinquency, Juvenile Delinquency (Obscene and Pornographic Materials): hearings before the United States Senate Committee on the Judiciary, Subcommittee To Investigate Juvenile Delinquency Pursuant to Senate Resolution 62, Investigation of Juvenile Delinquency in the United States, May 24, 26, 31, June 9 and 18, 1955, 84th Congress, 1st session.

Juvenile delinquency